Hamisi Andrea Kigwangalla (born 7 August 1975) is a Tanzanian CCM politician and Member of Parliament for Nzega constituency since 2010.

Early life and education
Hamisi Andrea Kigwangalla was born on 7 August 1975. His father was a banker with the National Bank of Commerce. His mother, Bagaile Bakari Lumola (a retired CCM employee), was a primary school teacher in Nzega Ndogo Primary School, in Nzega town, where his father was posted to open a new branch of the bank.

Kigwangalla's father, Nasser Mahampa Kigwangalla, descends from a well-known Kimbu clan from Goweko – Igalula, and his mother was the daughter of a Nyamwezi Chief, Lumola Bakari Maulid (a key figure in Hamisi A. Kigwangalla’s upbringing following the divorce of his parents at a young age). His maternal grandfather attended Tabora School a few years ahead of Julius Nyerere.

He was educated at Kigoma and Shinyanga secondary schools before joining the University of Dar es Salaam where he pursued a medicine degree from 1999 to its completion in 2004. He then pursued postgraduate studies in Sweden at the Blekinge Institute of Technology (M.B.A.) and Karolinska Institutet (M.P.H.). He is currently finalizing a (Ph.D.) thesis in Public Health (Health Systems and Health Economics) at the University of Cape Town (South Africa).

Career

He is a Member of Parliament sitting in the National Assembly representing Nzega constituency of the Tabora region. He was first elected in the national elections on October 31, 2010. His appointment by the national executive council to run for the post through the ruling party Chama Cha Mapinduzi (CCM) ticket was followed by a lot of criticism with critics claiming that he was appointed to contest for the post despite being the second runner up after Hussein Mohammed Bashe (the winner of the primary votes), who was not favoured on account of his citizenship being unclear, and the incumbent Lucas Lumambo Selelii (1st runner up) in the primaries, because he was working for the First Lady of Tanzania's charitable organisation, Wanawake na Maendeleo (WAMA), a rumour which he denies.

Immediately after his nomination by the CCM's top congregation, he was also arrested by the immigration police on charges of being a non-citizen of Tanzania and this became a center issue in the Tanzanian media. He was however cleared two days later. Despite the fact that he was cleared by the immigration officials, he still had to face stern objections from the opposition contestants.

Despite criticism and allegations, Kigwangalla won the elections. He was featured in daily newspapers in Tanzania saying that he intends to table a motion in the National Assembly claiming that the Golden Pride Gold Mine, a gold mining project located in Nzega and owned by Australian mining giant subsidiary company Resolute Tanzania Ltd, is useless and has no benefits to people from Nzega and the country at large and that it should be closed. Kigwangalla was re-elected to the Parliament in the recently concluded (October 2015) Tanzanian general elections to represent the Nzega Rural Constituency on a CCM ticket.

Kigwangalla was a vocal defender of the Tanzanian government's crackdown on LGBT rights under president John Magufuli. In an April 2017 interview with BuzzFeed News while serving as deputy health minister, he said he supported the use of anal exams to judge whether someone has had gay sex, despite it being widely considered by medical experts to be a violation of human rights.

Personal
Kigwangalla has authored a policy framework book, Kigwanomics and the Tanzania We Want: From Renaissance to Transformation.

References

External links

 

1975 births
Living people
Chama Cha Mapinduzi MPs
Tanzanian MPs 2010–2015
Tanzanian public health doctors
Kigoma Secondary School alumni
Shinyanga Secondary School alumni
Muhimbili University of Health and Allied Sciences alumni
Karolinska Institute alumni
People from Tabora Region
Government ministers of Tanzania